The following are the appointments to various Canadian Honours of 2022. Usually, they are announced as part of the New Year and Canada Day celebrations and are published within the Canada Gazette during the year. This follows the custom set out within the United Kingdom which publishes its appoints of various British Honours for New Year's and for monarch's official birthday. However, instead of the midyear appointments announced on Victoria Day, the official birthday of the Canadian Monarch, this custom has been transferred with the celebration of Canadian Confederation and the creation of the Order of Canada.

However, as the Canada Gazette publishes appointment to various orders, decorations and medal, either Canadian or from Commonwealth and foreign states, this article will reference all Canadians so honoured during the 2022 calendar year.

The first appointments to the Order of Canada were announced on December 29, 2021.

The Order of Merit

Sovereign of the Order of Merit as of 8 September 2022

His Majesty King Charles III, King of Canada

Member of the Order of Merit
 Professor Margaret MacMillan, OM, CC, CH, FRSL, FRSC, FBA, FRCGS

The Order of Canada

Sovereign of the Order of Canada as of 8 September 2022
His Majesty King Charles III, King of Canada

Companions of the Order of Canada

 Yann Martel, CC
 Hon. Murray Sinclair, CC, MSC
 Stacey Ann Allaster, C.C.
 Frank Joseph Hayden, C.C., O.Ont. (this is a promotion within the Order)
 Peter Howard Russell, C.C. (this is a promotion within the Order)
 Donald Joseph Savoie, C.C., O.N.B. (this is a promotion within the Order)

Officers of the Order of Canada

 Mehran Anvari, OC, OOnt
 Carl-Éric Aubin, OC
 Neil Bissoondath, OC, CQ
 Liona Boyd, OC, OOnt
 Barry D. Bultz, OC, AOE
 Pieter Cullis, OC
 Navjeet Singh Dhillon, OC
 Hon. Lillian Dyck, OC
 Connie Eaves, OC
 Hon. Ross Fitzpatrick, OC, OBC
 Geoffrey T. Fong, OC
 Evelyn L. Forget, OC
 Hon. Hugh Fraser, OC
 Victoria Grant, OC
 Margo Lainne Greenwood, OC
 Frances Henry, OC
 Tomson Highway, OC
 C. Céleste Johnston, OC
 Vaikuntam Iyer Lakshmanan, OC
 Frederick A. Leighton, OC
 J. R. Léveillé, OC
 Patricia Livingston, OC
 Alejandro G. Marangoni, OC
 Roderick R. McInnes, OC, OOnt
 Donald Chisholm McKenzie, OC, MSM
 Ovide Mercredi, OC, OM
 Jacques Yves Montplaisir, OC
 Helene Polatajko, OC
 Edward J. Ratushny, OC, OOnt, QC
 Jean Riley Senft, OC
 Graham David Sher, OC
 Helga Stephenson, OC, OOnt
 Angela Swan, OC
 Ian Tamblyn, OC
 Carol M. Tator, OC
 D. R. Fraser Taylor, OC
 Louise Trottier, OC
 Verena Tunnicliffe, OC
 Mary Ellen Turpel-Lafond, OC
 Naomi Sara Azrieli, O.C.
 Donovan Bailey, O.C., O.Ont.
 Hon. Ethel Dorothy Blondin-Andrew, P.C., O.C.
 Robert Charles Davidson, O.C., O.B.C. (This is a promotion within the Order)
 Paul Joseph Dubord, O.C.
 Aled Morgan Edwards, O.C.
 Donald Arthur Enarson, O.C. (deceased)
 François Girard, O.C.
 Ian Stewart Hodkinson, O.C.
 Angela Diane James, O.C.
 David Thomas Lynch, O.C.
 Sandra Oh, O.C.
 Alberto Pérez-Gómez, O.C.
 David Waltner-Toews, O.C.

Honorary Members of the Order of Canada
 Jackie Richardson, CM

Members of the Order of Canada

 Harold Bassford, CM
 Francine Bois, CM
 Mary Ruth Brooks, CM
 Ann Buller, CM
 Judy Cameron, CM
 Hon. Sandra Chapnik, CM, OOnt
 Deborah Chatsis, CM
 Ralph Chiodo, CM, OOnt
 Lily Siewsan Chow, CM
 Eld. Ruth Christie, CM, OM
 Michael P. Collins, CM
 Gail Cyr, CM
 Sharon Davis-Murdoch, CM
 Janis Dunning, CM
 Jacques Lemay, CM
 Max Eisen, CM
 Robert Eisenberg, CM
 John Estacio, CM
 Charlie Kakotok Evalik, CM
 Mohamad Fakih, CM
 Graham Farquharson, CM
 Patricia M. Feheley, CM
 Eleanor Fish, CM
 Gerald Friesen, CM
 Rabbi Baruch Frydman-Kohl, CM
 Janice Fukakusa, CM
 Leo Joel Goldhar, CM
 Morris Goodman, CM
 Eric Ross Macdonald Haldenby, CM
 Walter N. Hardy, CM
 Lucille Harper, CM
 Jane Heyman, CM
 Jean Houde, CM
 William Humber, CM
 Lawson A. W. Hunter, CM, QC
 Kenneth W. Knox, CM
 Vahan Kololian, CM
 Olga Eliza Korper, CM
 Marc Labrèche, CM
 Gilbert Lacasse, CM
 Yves Lambert, CM
 Barbara Landau, CM
 Gerald Andrew Edward Lawrence, CM
 Pierre Legendre, CM, OQ
 Rose Lipszyc, CM
 Allan S. MacDonald, CM
 Andrew Paul MacDonald, CM
 Nona Macdonald Heaslip, CM
 Joy MacPhail, CM
 Ginette Mantha, CM
 Gregory Marchildon, CM
 Elizabeth McGregor, CM
 Bob McKeown, CM
 Pradeep Merchant, CM
 Pamela J. Minns, CM
 John Morrisseau, CM
 David Mostoway, CM
 Kathy Murphy, CM
 Kevin Murphy, CM
 Ralph Nilson, CM
 Janice O’Born, CM, OOnt
 Eva Olsson, CM, OOnt
 Barbara Paterson, CM
 Red Pedersen, CM, ONu
 W. Roman Petryshyn, CM
 Robin Poitras, CM
 Lynn Posluns, CM
 Alexander Reford, CM
 Léo Robert, CM
 Hazel Robinson, CM
 John Robinson, CM
 David Roche, CM
 Reginald Schwager, CM
 Harvey Secter, CM
 Robert Irwin Silver, CM
 Robert Small, CM
 Barry Smit, CM, OOnt
 Diane Sowden, CM
 Harriet H. Stairs, CM
 Sharon Straus, CM
 Barbara G. Stymiest, CM
 Bruny Surin, CM, CQ
 Curtis A. Suttle, CM
 Cara Tannenbaum, CM
 George M. Thomson, CM
 Jean-Marie Toulouse, CM, OQ
 Peter Vaughan, CM, CD
 Gilles Vincent, CM, CQ
 Luc Vinet, CM, OQ
 Janet Walker, CM, CD
 Vaughn Wyant, CM
 Peter Zandstra, CM
 David Zussman, CM
 Frances Abele, C.M.
 Ajay K. Agrawal, C.M.
 Louis-Philippe J. Léo Albert, C.M.
 R. Jamie Anderson, C.M.
 Suzanne Aubry, C.M.
 Hereditary Chief Stephen Joseph Augustine, C.M.
 Granger Richard Avery, C.M.
 Michel Beaulac, C.M.
 André Blanchet, C.M.
 Marilyn C. Bodogh, C.M.
 Jacques Bourgault, C.M.
 Bernard Brault, C.M.
 Marilyn Caroline Brooks-Coles, C.M., O.Ont.
 Hon. Marion R. Buller, C.M.
 James Thomas Byrnes, C.M., O.B.C.
 Geneviève Cadieux, C.M.
 James Lloyd Cassels, C.M., Q.C.
 Euclide Patrice Chiasson, C.M.
 William Foster Clark, C.M.
 Zane Cohen, C.M., O.Ont.
 Ethel Côté, C.M., O.Ont.
 Elder Reg Crow Shoe, C.M. 
 Elder Rosemary Crow Shoe, C.M.
 Sheldon John Currie, C.M.
 Reginald Lester Davidson, C.M.
 Dorothy Ina Elgiva Dobbie, C.M.
 Eliahu Tzion Fathi, C.M.
 Madeleine Féquière, C.M.
 S/Sgt. Gary Eugene Goulet, C.M., (Ret’d)
 Michael Terry Harris, C.M.
 Paul Earl Heinbecker, C.M.
 Deborra Jane Hope, C.M.
 Sister Margaret Mary Hughes, C.M.
 Moira Fleming Hutchinson, C.M.
 Gérard Jean, C.M.
 Adam Kahane, C.M.
 Nancy Uqquujuq Karetak-Lindell, C.M.
 Eva-Marie Kröller, C.M.
 Gary Avrom Levy, C.M., O.Ont.
 Alexander Mair, C.M.
 Guy Matte, C.M.
 Milton McClaren, C.M.
 Roderick James McKay, C.M.
 Ben Mink, C.M.
 Donald James Mowat, C.M.
 Robert Donald Munro, C.M.
 Sister Bernadette Mary O’Reilly, C.M.
 Donna Ouchterlony, C.M.
 Fred Pellerin, C.M., C.Q.
 Elder David Gerard Perley, C.M. 
 Elder Imelda Mary Perley, C.M.
 G. Ross Peters, C.M.
 Sandra Pitblado, C.M.
 Guy Jacques Pratte, C.M.
 Parminder S. Raina, C.M.
 Joel Solomon Reitman, C.M.
 David Nicholas Rush, C.M.
 Hon. Anne Helen Russell, C.M., Q.C.
 Suzanne Sauvage, C.M., O.Q.
 Martin T. Schechter, C.M., O.B.C.
 Jacques Jean Meor Shore, C.M.
 Ronald Julien Tremblay, C.M.
 Guylaine Tremblay, C.M.
 Michelle Valberg, C.M.
 Germaine Therese Warkentin, C.M.
 James Malcolm West, C.M.
 Michael West, C.M., O.Man
 Margie Wolfe, C.M.
 Lorraine M. Wright, C.M.
 Robert Stewart Wyatt, C.M.
 Jan Zwicky, C.M.

Terminiation of appointment to the Order of Canada
15 October 2022: "Notice is hereby given that the appointment of Johnny Nurraq Seotatituq Issaluk to the Order of Canada was terminated by Ordinance signed by the Governor General of Canada on August 31, 2022."

Order of Military Merit

Sovereign of the Order of Military Merit as of 8 September 2022
 His Majesty The King of Canada

Extraordinary Commander of the Order of Military Merit
 Vice-Admiral & Lieutenant-General His Royal Highness The Prince Charles, Prince of Wales PC, KG, KT, GCB, OM, AK, QSO, GCL, CC, CMM, SOM, CD, ADC

Termination of appointement to the Order of Military Merit
 Roch Lanteigne, (MMM), ONB, MSM, CD: Notice is hereby given that, further to his individual request and the Governor General’s subsequent approval, the appointment of Master Warrant Officer (Retired) Roch Lanteigne to the Order of Military Merit was terminated by Ordinance signed on February 11, 2022.
 General (Retired) Jonathan Holbert Vance, (CMM), MSC, CD: Notice is hereby given that, further to his individual request and the Governor General’s subsequent approval, the appointment of General (Retired) Jonathan Holbert Vance to the Order of Military Merit was terminated by Ordinance signed on April 20, 2022.

Order of Merit of the Police Forces

Sovereign of the Order of the Police Forces - 8 September 2022

His Majesty The King of Canada

Officers of the Order of Merit of the Police Forces

 Chief Evan Bray, O.O.M.
 Deputy Commissioner Brian Frederick Brennan, O.O.M.
 Chief Shawn Dulude, O.O.M.
 Chief Daniel J. Kinsella, O.O.M. (This is a promotion within the Order)
 Chief Dean T. LaGrange, O.O.M.
 Director Jean-Pierre Larose, O.O.M.
 Assistant Commissioner Maureen Elizabeth Levy, O.O.M.
 Assistant Commissioner Jane MacLatchy, O.O.M.
 Chief James Ramer, O.O.M. (This is a promotion within the Order)
 Chief Jerel Swamp, O.O.M.
 Sergeant Casey Ward, O.O.M.

Members of the Order of Merit of the Police Forces

 Akram Askoul, M.O.M.
 Sergeant Michelle Lee Bacik, M.O.M.
 Lisa Bianco, M.O.M.
 Associate Director François Bleau, M.O.M.
 Inspector Jason Paul Bobrowich, M.O.M.
 Superintendent Martin Bruce, M.O.M.
 Inspector David Brunner, M.O.M.
 Superintendent Manly J. K. Burleigh, M.O.M.
 Chief Edward Lennard Busch, M.O.M.
 Inspector Carl Cartright, M.O.M.
 Superintendent Stephen Cocks, M.O.M.
 Superintendent David Cook, M.O.M.
 Superintendent Elizabeth Darling, M.O.M.
 Acting Deputy Chief Myron Demkiw, M.O.M.
 Staff Sergeant Michael Elliott, M.O.M.
 Assistant Commissioner John Graham Ferguson, M.O.M.
 Inspector James Flewelling, M.O.M.
 Deputy Chief Brett Flynn, M.O.M.
 Superintendent Richard Frayne, M.O.M.
 Staff Sergeant Scott C. Fuller, M.O.M.
 Acting Sergeant Major Cheryl Gervais, M.O.M.
 Superintendent S. Dean Hilton, M.O.M.
 William Blaine Hutchins, M.O.M.
 Chief Constable David Jansen, M.O.M.
 Christopher D. John, M.O.M.
 Inspector Gregory Leong, M.O.M.
 Chief James MacSween, M.O.M.
 Superintendent Carole Matthews, M.O.M.
 Superintendent Cameron Grant McBride, M.O.M.
 Corps Sergeant Major Alan Daniel McCambridge, M.O.M., M.S.C.
 Inspector Timothy McGough, M.O.M.
 Constable Gary McLaughlin, M.O.M.
 Mourad Meberbeche, M.O.M.
 Constable Josée Mensales, M.O.M.
 Staff Sergeant Brent Jason Meyer, M.O.M.
 Deputy Chief Nick Milinovich, M.O.M.
 Sergeant David Moe, M.O.M.
 Commander Dominic Monchamp, M.O.M.
 Staff Sergeant Kevin Murray, M.O.M.
 Superintendent Patrick Gerald Nogier, M.O.M.
 Detective Sergeant Gary W. O’Brien, M.O.M.
 Staff Sergeant Lyndsay A. O’Ruairc, M.O.M.
 Deputy Chief Anthony Odoardi, M.O.M.
 Chief Superintendent Stephanie Patterson, M.O.M.
 Corporal Deepak Prasad, M.O.M.
 Sergeant Matthew J. Robinson, M.O.M.
 Deputy Chief Robertson Rouse, M.O.M.
 Sergeant Katherine Elizabeth Severson, M.O.M.
 Deputy Chief Harjinder Singh Sidhu, M.O.M.
 Corporal Leif Anthony Balle Svendsen, M.O.M.
 Superintendent Ricky Veerappan, M.O.M.
 Detective Staff Sergeant Scott Cameron Wade, M.O.M.
 Chief Stephen Williams, M.O.M.
 Craig Ernest Yorke, M.O.M.

Royal Victorian Order

Sovereign of the Royal Victorian Order as of 8 September 2022
 His Majesty The King of Canada

Most Venerable Order of the Hospital of St. John of Jerusalem

Sovereign Head of the Order of St. John as of 8 September 2022
 His Majesty The King of Canada

Bailiff Grand Cross of the Order of St. John
 Robert Hector White

Knights and Dames of the Order of St. John
 Richard Neville
 Her Honour Eva Qamaniq Aariak
 Robert Mark Frank, C.D., AdeC
 Edward David Hodgins
 The Right Honourable Richard Wagner, P.C.

Commanders of the Order of St. John
 Laurie Anne Anderson
 Robert Boily
 Travis Ryan Lanoway, C.D.
 Lawrence David Wong, C.D.
 N. Joel R. Campbell
 Major Jacques Coiteux, M.M.M., C.D.
 Susan Beth Davis
 Michael Kristian Dussault
 Harvey Fields
 Dany Houde
 John Macdonell
 Kevin Robert Edward McCormick
 Charles McVicker
 Ross Nicholls
 Andrew James Philpot
 Ellen Lac-Yenh So

Officers of the Order of St. John
 John David Broughton, C.D.
 Lisa Danielle Burke
 Po Kwan Tara Chan
 Brandon Fang
 Major Paul Ernest Jean Joseph Henry, C.D. (Retired)
 Patricia Katherine Kearney
 Stephen Lawrence Kern, C.D.
 Vicken Koundakjian
 Henri Levasseur, C.D., AdeC
 Jay Christopher Noden
 Kevin James Stinson
 Frederick Yim
 Brett W. J. Carr
 Colleen Anne Dell
 Lucie Houde
 Marie Corine Nadine Laflamme, C.D.
 Alec David Luker
 Stephanie Dawn Peachey
 Hulbert Paul Lindahl Silver

Members of the Order of St. John
 Yannick Bibeau
 Corporal Stephen Richard Brown
 Major-General Joseph Jean Guy Chapdelaine, O.M.M., C.D., Q.H.C.
 Louise Chauvet
 Brandon Richard Collision
 Brandon Eustacchio Disimine
 Master Corporal Andrew Patrick Finnigan
 Captain Mark Allan Gallant
 Cindy Hodson
 Ying Lei Huang
 Pierre La Voie
 Sherman Lip
 Caitlin Melyssa Loo
 Gloria D. Madden
 Christopher Robert Edward McCormick
 Warrant Officer Claire Paquet, C.D.
 Mario Paquette
 Jason Paul
 Lisa Courtney Paul
 Sergeant Lloyd David Payette, C.D. (Retired)
 Jonathan Pelletier-Bureau
 Nickolas Petuhoff
 Elvis Tavares Silva
 Douglas William Sirant
 Tiffany Sun
 Brian The
 Teresa Lynn Toutant
 Cassandra Nicole Trueman
 Angela Uta Walmsley
 Karen Lynn Wright
 Cimarron Sarna Ballantyne
 Katherine Michelle Bayer
 Jill Biggs
 Michele Marie Boriel
 Robert William Cunningham
 Marie Ida Sylvie Dupuis
 Sandra Marie Forward
 Jack Michael Hearn
 Morgan Elijah Janes
 Lieutenant-Colonel Paul Edward Joudrey, C.D. (Retired)
 Captain Brendan J. L’Heureux
 Jodi Anne McKean
 Edward Allan McNabb
 Haider Rizvi
 Jane Louise Smith
 Trevor Chase Sproule
 Ronald James Sullivan
 Alexandra Tardif-Morency
 Yick Nam Edison Ting
 Charles Veillette
 William T. Walker

Provincial & Territorial Honours

National Order of Québec

Grand Officers of the National Order of Québec

 Dr Michel Chrétien, OC, GOQ (This is a promotion within the Order)

Officers of the National Order of Québec

 M. Louis Audet
 Mme Joséphine Bacon
 M. François Crépeau
 Mme Sophie D’Amours
 M. Jean-François Lépine
 M. Pierre Karl Péladeau
 M. Samuel Pierre (This is a promotion within the Order)
 Dre Caroline Quach-Thanh
 M. Sidney Stevens
 M. Jean St-Gelais

Knight of the National Order of Québec

 M. Michel Bouvier
 M. Michel Clair
 M. Jean Pierre Desrosiers
 M. Vincent Dumez
 Mme Louise Forestier
 M. Gaëtan Gagné
 M. Alain-G. Gagnon
 Mme Louisiane Gauthier
 M. Michel Labrecque
 M. Pierre Lahoud
 Mme Suzanne Lareau
 Mme France Légaré
 M. Roland Lepage
 M. James A. O’Reilly
 M. Marc Parent
 Mme Léa Pool
 Mme Denise Robert
 Mme Francine Saillant
 Mme Anik Shooner
 M. René Simard
 M. Jean Soulard

Saskatchewan Order of Merit

 Wayne Brownlee
 Carol GoldenEagle
 Trevor Herriot
 John Hopkins
 Shirley Isbister, S.V.M.
 Harry Lafond
 Dr. Alan Rosenberg
 Marilyn Whitehead

Order of British Columbia

 Dr. Nadine Rena Caron
 Chief Rosanne Casimir
 Nezhat Khosrowshahi
 Kathy Kinloch
 Joy MacPhail, C.M.
 Fred Ting Shek Mah
 Harinder Mahil
 Maureen Maloney, Q.C.
 Geoff Plant, Q.C.
 Christine Sinclair, O.C.
 Paul Spong
 Gerald St. Germain, P.C.
 Jody Wilson-Raybould, P.C., Q.C.
 Bruce Munro Wright

Alberta Order of Excellence

 Maureen Bianchini Purvis
 Robert Brawn
 M. Elizabeth Cannon
 Eleanor Chiu
 Cheryl Foggo
 Art Froehlich
 Cam Tait

Order of Prince Edward Island

 Dr. John Andrew
 Gary Schneider
 Claudette Thériault

Order of Manitoba

 Mohamed El Tassi
 Andre Lewis
 Andrew Paterson
 Shirley Richardson
 Darcy Ataman
 James Eldridge
 Doug Harvey
 Leo Ledohowski
 Megumi Masaki
 Alix Jean-Paul
 Marcy Markusa

Order of New Brunswick

 Jean-Claude Basque
 Cecile Cassista
 Randy Dickinson, C.M.
 Penny Ericson
 Aurèle Ferlatte, C.M.
 Lucinda Flemer, O.C.
 Sandra Irving, O.C.
 Larry Nelson, O.C.
 Valois Robichaud 
 Robert Sylliboy

Order of Nova Scotia

 Col. John Boileau, C.D.
 Kenzie MacNeil
 Rustum Southwell
 Dr. Robert Strang
 Hope Swinimer

Order of Newfoundland and Labrador

Robert W. Cormier, C.M.
Dr. Catherine Donovan
Alan Doyle, C.M.
Dr. Janice Fitzgerald
Carla Emerson Furlong
Joseph Goudie
Dr. Proton Rahman
Maxwell Short

Order of the Northwest Territories

 JoAnne Deneron
 Paul Kaeser II
 Mary Effie Snowshoe

Meritorious Service Decorations

Meritorious Service Cross (Civil Division)

 Wanda Bedard, M.S.C.
 Sophia Grinvalds, M.S.C.
 Paul Grinvalds, M.S.C.
 Peter Warrack, M.S.C.
 Phyllis M. C. Webstad, M.S.C.

Meritorious Service Medal (Civil Division)

 Chris J. Adam, M.S.M.
 Brandon Arkinson, M.S.M.
 Angela Arnone, M.S.M.
 Mohammad H. Asadi Lari, M.S.M. (deceased)
 Christine Josiane Claudine Baïet-Lorin, M.S.M.
 Kehkashan Basu, M.S.M.
 Chief Superintendent Ghalib Bhayani, M.O.M., M.S.M.
 Jean Boileau, M.B., M.S.M.
 Walter M. P. Cami, M.S.M.
 Doug Chisholm, M.S.M.
 Evelyne Comte, M.S.M.
 Andrew D. Connors, M.S.M.
 René Dallaire, C.Q., M.S.M.
 Adrianne G. Dartnall, M.S.M.
 Seema David, M.S.M.
 Roopan David, M.S.M.
 Philippe Degroote, M.S.M.
 Peter Grant deMarsh, M.S.M. (deceased)
 Nevaeh Joey Denine, M.S.M. (deceased)
 Holly Denine, M.S.M.
 Gloria Dennis, M.S.M.
 Major Jean-Marie Dez, M.S.M.
 Marcel Claude Henri Diologent, M.S.M.
 Julie Devon Dodd, M.S.M.
 Nadine Francillon, M.S.M.
 Pierre Gagné, M.S.M. (deceased)
 Bryan G. Garber, M.S.M., C.D.
 Marlene V. Grass, M.S.M.
 Hervé Hoffer, M.S.M. (deceased)
 Nicole Hoffer, M.S.M.
 Marc Hull-Jacquin, M.S.M.
 Nancy Knowlton, M.S.M.
 Pierre Labine, M.S.M.
 Jacques Larivière, M.S.M.
 Yves Le Maner, M.S.M.
 Richard F. Lennert, M.S.M.
 Frédéric Leturque, M.S.M.
 Steve Ludzik, M.S.M.
 Kirstin Lund, M.S.M.
 David Martin, M.S.M.
 Gerard Francis McCarthy, M.S.M. (deceased)
 Ralph McLean, M.S.M.
 Bernard Milleville, M.S.M.
 Benoit Mottrie, M.S.M.
 Alexandre Sacha Noukhovitch, M.S.M.
 Barbara Pasternak, M.S.M.
 Rico (René) Perriard, M.S.M.
 Martine Pietrois, M.S.M.
 Shafique Pirani, M.S.M.
 Tony Priftakis, M.S.M.
 Nicole Provost, M.S.M.
 Jean-Pierre Puchois, M.S.M.
 Wayne Quinn, M.M.M., M.S.M., C.D.
 Alain Rioux, M.S.M.
 Corentin Rousman, M.S.M.
 Nik Semenoff, M.S.M.
 Pierre Sénéchal, M.S.M.
 Christophe Serieys, M.S.M.
 Erwin Ureel, M.S.M.
 Dell Marie Wergeland, M.S.M.

Mention in Dispatches

 Captain PC Hanly 
 Lieutenant(N) JE Love 
 Sergeant E. Alexander 
 Master-Corporal NJJP Audet-Larivée 
 Corporal EL Galloway

Commonwealth and Foreign Orders, Decorations and Medals awarded to Canadians

From Her Majesty The Queen in Right of Australia

Bravery Medal 

 Tyler White

From Her Majesty The Queen in Right of Jamaica

Commander of the Order of Distinction 

 Dr. Upton Dilworth Allen, O.Ont.

Badge of Honour for Meritorious Service 

 Marsha Tanya Brown
 Carol Ivis Phillips

From Her Majesty The Queen in Right of New Zealand

Member of the New Zealand Order of Merit 

 Dr. Alison Patricia Barrett

From His Majesty The King of Belgium

Commander of the Order of the Crown 

 André Sincennes

Knight of the Order of the Crown 

 Cathy Levy, C.M.

Golden Palms of the Order of the Crown (Labour Decoration, First Class) 

 Jeannette Mazur
 Eric De Wallens

From the President of the Federative Republic of Brazil

Grand Officer of the Order of the Aeronautical Merit 

 Lieutenant-General Alexander Donald Meinzinger, C.M.M., M.S.M., C.D.

From the President of the Republic of Colombia

Knight of the National Order of Merit 

 Oscar Alfonso Morales Diaz

Marco Fidel Suárez Medal 

 BGen. Patrice Laroche, O.M.M., C.D. (Retired)
 LCol. Forrest Glen Rock, M.S.C., C.D.
 LCol. Robert Malcolm Saunders, C.D.

Aguila de Gules Medal 

 Capt. Duane John Lecaine, C.D. (Retired)
 Capt. Willem Werner Plikett, C.D.

“Fe en la Causa” de la Fuerza Aérea Colombiana Military Medal 

 Master Warrant Officer Dennis Arthur Booker, C.D. (Retired)
 Capt. Glenn Wade Scott, C.D.

From the President of the French Republic

Grand Officer of the National Order of the Legion of Honour 

 Helen Vari, C.M.

Commander of the National Order of the Legion of Honour 

 Hon. Antonine Maillet, P.C., C.C., O.Q., O.N.B.

Officer of the National Order of the Legion of Honour 

 David Weisstub

Knight of the National Order of the Legion of Honour 

 Hon. Joseph Michel Doyon, Q.C.
 Hon. Catherine McKenna, P.C.
 Donna Theo Strickland, C.C.
 Anthony Von Mandl

Officer of the National Order of Merit 

 Louise Imbeault, O.N.B.
 Hon. Aldéa Landry, P.C., C.M., Q.C.

Knight of the National Order of Merit 

 Erik Hougen
 Denis Racine
 Riva Walia

Commander of the Order of Academic Palms 

 Paul Perron

Officer of the Order of Academic Palms 

 Thierry Chopin

Knight of the Order of Academic Palms 

 Odile Canadas
 Catherine Losier
 Francis Weil

Knight of the Order of Agricultural Merit 

 Jean-Marc Guillot
 Serge Maury
 Olivier Perret
 Catherine Thomas
 Olivier Tourrette

Officer of the Order of Arts and Letters 

 Michèle Boisvert, C.Q.
 Phil Comeau, C.M.
 Yannick Nézet-Séguin, C.C., O.Q.

Knight of the Order of Arts and Letters 

 Joséphine Bacon
 Choi Chi Kin Calvin
 Thomas-Louis Côté
 Catherine Dalphond
 Marcelle Dubois
 Barbara Fischer
 Gregory Gallant
 Marcel Jean
 Odile Joannette
 Molly Johnson, O.C.
 Natasha Kanapé-Fontaine
 Marie-Andrée Lamontagne
 Louise Lapointe
 Hélène Laverdure
 Lisa Leblanc
 Dominique Lemieux
 Lisa Marlène Ntibayindusha
 Michel Rabagliati
 Rodney Saint-Eloi
 Stefan Saint-Laurent
 Marie-Jo Thério
 Alain Thibault
 Kim Thúy, C.Q.

National Defence Medal, Bronze Echelon 

 Major-General Jean André Simon Bernard, O.M.M., C.D.
 Captain Peter Rudolf Stocker, M.S.M., C.D.

From the President of Hungary

Officer’s Cross of the Order of Merit of Hungary 

 Emoke Jolán Erzsébet Szathmáry, C.M., O.M.

Knight’s Cross of the Order of Merit of Hungary 

 Frank Leo, Jr
 Tamás Ugray

Gold Cross of Merit of Hungary 

 Tamás József Buday
 Pál Domby
 Éva Toldy

Silver Cross of Merit of Hungary 

 Judith Ildikó Boda-Lázár

From the President of the Italian Republic

Knight of the Order of the Star of Italy 

 Phyllis Barbara Lambert, C.C., G.O.Q.

From His Majesty The Emperor of Japan

Order of the Rising Sun, Gold Rays with Rosette 

 Robert Keating

From the President of the Republic of Korea

Civil Merit Medal 

 Andrew Burtch
 Lee Yong Hwa

Korea Service Medal 

 Maj. Casey William McLean, C.D.

From the President of the Republic of Latvia

Order of the Three Stars, Fifth Class 

 Lauma Stikuts

From the President of the Republic of Poland

Knight’s Cross of the Order of Polonia Restituta 

 Paweł Piotr Korbel

Gold Cross of Merit 

 Danuta Agnieszka Gumienik
 Teresa Maria Klimuszko

Cross of Freedom and Solidarity 

 Regina Goman
 Wiktoria Karkuszewska
 Paweł Piotr Korbel
 Jacek Krzysztof Krzewski
 Krystyna Irena Sawicka
 Zbigniew Edward Sawicki

Medal of the Centenary of Polish Independence 

 Zenon Tomasz Przybylak

From His Majesty The King of Spain

Commander of the Order of Civil Merit 

 Douglas Cardinal, O.C.

From the President of Ukraine

Order of Merit, 3rd Class 

 Jill Sinclair

From the President of the United States of America

Officer of the Legion of Merit 

 Brigadier-General Joseph Raoul Stéphane Boivin, O.M.M., M.S.C., C.D.
 Brigadier-General Jeannot Sylvain Emmanuel Boucher, O.M.M., M.S.M., C.D.
 Brigadier-General William Hilton Fletcher, O.M.M., S.M.V., C.D.
 Major-General Sylvain Yvon Ménard, M.S.M., C.D.

Legionnaire of the Legion of Merit 

 (Acting) Commander Maureen E. Levy
 Colonel Kyle Christopher Paul, O.M.M., C.D.
 Colonel John Alan Roper, C.D.

Defence Meritorious Service Medal 

 Lieutenant-Colonel Donna Lee Allen, C.D.
 Major David Carl Andrews, C.D.
 Lieutenant-Colonel Joseph Martin Arsenault, C.D.
 Captain David Theodore Berardo, C.D.
 Lieutenant(N) Olivier Boucher
 Lieutenant(N) Philip William Bowman, C.D.
 Lieutenant-Colonel Michael Anthony Campbell, C.D.
 Major Andrew N. Champion, C.D.
 Lieutenant-Colonel Peter Chan, C.D.
 Major Tracie Lynne Constable, C.D. (Retired)
 Lieutenant-Colonel René Hugo Delisle, C.D.
 Master Warrant Officer Raymond Denis Ethier, C.D.
 Lieutenant-Colonel Michael Thomas S. Fawcett, O.M.M., C.D.
 Master Corporal Martine Marie Danielle Fortier
 Sergeant Graham John Frampton, C.D.
 Lieutenant-Colonel Thomas Joseph Gale, C.D.
 Major David William Garvin, C.D.
 Captain Anthony Gauthier-Imbeault, C.D.
 Lieutenant-Colonel Robert Glenn Hart, C.D.
 Lieutenant-Colonel David Jeffery Holtz, C.D.
 Captain Alexandre Emile Labranche
 Lieutenant(N) Ludivine Myriam Michèle Laperrière, C.D. (Retired)
 Major Gary Philip Lawlor, C.D.
 Warrant Officer François Joseph Raymond Le Brun, C.D.
 Lieutenant-Colonel Nicolas J. Lussier-Nivischiuk, C.D.
 Master Warrant Officer Richard John Martin, M.M.M., C.D.
 Major Leonard Larry Matiowsky, C.D.
 Major Keith Rodney McCharles, C.D.
 Major Mark Steven Noel, C.D.
 Major Daniel Anthony O’Connor, C.D.
 Lieutenant-Colonel Richard Gregory Palfrey, C.D.
 Lieutenant-Commander Ji-Hwan Park, C.D.
 Captain Ripley James Pennell, C.D.
 Major Elmar Alberto Pinto Canas
 Sergeant Elissa J. Purvis
 Major Joseph Armand Guillaume Robert, C.D.
 Staff Sergeant Ronald E. Rose
 Chief Petty Officer 2nd Class Derrick Alexander Roulston, M.M.M., C.D.
 Major Virginia Shea, C.D.
 Lieutenant-Colonel Adam Nicholas Siokalo, C.D.
 Major Andrew Jeffrey Skinner, C.D.
 Master Corporal Travis William Sutherland
 Supt. Jeffrey S. Thompson
 Major Christopher David Vernon, C.D.
 Commander Michael William Walker, C.D.
 Colonel Leonard Matthew Wappler, C.D.
 Major Christian Dominik Whelan, C.D.
 Lieutenant-Colonel John Thomas Williams, C.D.
 Major-General Michael Charles Wright, M.M.V., M.S.M., C.D.
 Lieutenant-Colonel Howard Ho Kwan Yu, C.D.

Meritorious Service Medal 

 Major Andrew A. Baier, C.D.
 Major Michael Bioletti, C.D.
 Lieutenant-Commander Derek Shawn Booth, C.D.
 Major Émilie Circé, C.D.
 Colonel Robbin Dale Dove, C.D.
 Colonel Bryn Elliott, C.D.
 Major Michael Paul Garrett
 Major Simon Pierre Charles Germain, C.D.
 Major David Austin McNiff, C.D.
 Major Wayne Andrew O’Donnell, C.D.
 Major Marc Antoine R. Parent, C.D.
 Colonel Christopher Michael Shapka, C.D.

Air Medal, Fifth Oak Leaf Cluster 

 Major David Austin McNiff, C.D.

Air Medal, Second Oak Leaf Cluster 

 Lieutenant-Colonel Shawn Alexander Guilbault, C.D.
 Master Corporal Teal William James Smith, C.D.

Air Medal, First Oak Leaf Cluster 

 Major David Joshua Foyers, C.D.
 Sergeant Douglas John James, C.D.
 Captain Kevin John Long, C.D.
 Major Stephen Angus McLean, C.D.

Air Medal 

 Master Corporal Imre Janos Kurt Glaser-Hille, C.D.
 Major Gary Philip Hartzenberg, C.D.
 Corporal Nathan Adam Lewis
 Sergeant Michael Thomas Nesbitt, C.D.

From the North Atlantic Treaty Organization (NATO)

NATO Meritorious Service Medal 

 Commodore Marcel Joseph Michel Hallé, O.M.M., C.D.

NATO Non-Article 5 Medal for the ISAF Operation 

 Lee Randall Heard, C.D.

References 

Orders, decorations, and medals of Canada
New Year Honours
Canadian